Yeo is a Chinese, English, and Korean surname.

Origins
As an English surname, Yeo is a toponymic surname meaning "river", either for people who lived near one of the Rivers Yeo, or any river in general. Variant spellings include Yoe and Youe.

As a Chinese surname, Yeo is a spelling of the pronunciation in different varieties of Chinese of a number of distinct surnames, listed below by their pronunciation in Mandarin Chinese:
Yáng, spelled Yeo or Yeoh based on its Hokkien pronunciation.
Yáo, spelled Yeo or Yeoh based on its Hokkien pronunciation
Ráo

As a Korean surname, the Revised Romanization of Korean (RR) spelling Yeo could correspond to any of three modern surnames:
. The largest lineage with this surname is the Hamyang Yeo clan.
. The largest lineage with this surname is the Uiryeong Yeo clan.
. 

Additionally, two historical Korean surnames are also spelled Yeo in Revised Romanization:
 
, which originated from the Buyeo kingdom

Statistics
Yeo was the 13th-most common Chinese surname in Singapore as of 1997 (ranked by English spelling, rather than by Chinese characters). Roughly 36,600 people, or 1.5% of the Chinese Singaporean population, bore the surname Yeo.

According to statistics cited by Patrick Hanks, there were 2,529 people on the island of Great Britain and 20 on the island of Ireland with the surname Yeo as of 2011. In 1881 there had been 1,565 people with the surname in Great Britain, mainly in Devon, while in mid-19th-century Ireland it was found primarily in Dublin and Kilkenny.

The 2010 United States Census found 2,805 people with the surname Yeo, making it the 11,272nd-most-common name in the country. This represented an increase from 2,194 (12,858th-most-common) in the 2000 Census. In the 2010 Census, about 55% of the bearers of the surname identified as Asian, and four-tenths as White. It was the 871st-most-common surname among respondents to the 2000 Census who identified as Asian.

People

Chinese surnames
Chinese surnames  or :
 Alvin Yeo (1962-2022), Singaporean lawyer
 Ben Yeo (born 1978), Singaporean actor
 Yeo Bee Yin (born 1983), Malaysian politician
 Yeo Cheow Tong (born 1947), Singaporean politician
 Danny Yeo, Singaporean television host
 Edmund Yeo (born 1984), Malaysian filmmaker
 George Yeo (born 1954), Singaporean former politician and Air Force brigadier-general
 Gwendoline Yeo (born 1977), Singaporean-born American actress and niece of George Yeo 
 Yeo Jia Min (born 1999), Singaporean badminton player
 Jamie Yeo (born 1977), Singaporean media personality
 Jerry Yeo (born 1986), Singaporean actor
 Joscelin Yeo (born 1979), Singaporean swimmer
 Yeo Keng Lian (died 1960), Chinese-born Singaporean founder of Yeo Hiap Seng
 K. K. Yeo (born 1952), Malaysian-born American bible scholar
 Kuei Pin Yeo, Indonesian classical pianist
 Yeo Ning Hong, Singaporean politician
 Philip Yeo (born 1946), Singaporean bureaucrat
 Richard Yeo (scientist), Chinese American scientist best known for his research on disposable diapers
 Vivien Yeo (born 1984), Malaysian actress
 Yeo Yann Yann (born 1977), Malaysian actress

Korean surnames
Korean surnames:
 Yeo Bong-hun (born 1994), South Korean football midfielder
 Yeo Bum-kyu (born 1962), South Korean football midfielder
 Yeo One, stage name of Yeo Chang-gu (born 1996), South Korean singer and actor
 Yeo In-hyeok, South Korean a cappella singer
 Yeo Hoe-hyun (born 1994), South Korean actor
 Yeo Hong-chul (born 1971), South Korean gymnast
 Yeo Hoon-min (born 1991), South Korean singer, former member of U-KISS
 Yeo Hyo-jin (born 1983), South Korean football defender
 Yeo Hyun-soo (born 1982), South Korean actor
 Yeo Jin-goo (born 1997), South Korean actor
 Yeo Kab-soon (born 1971), South Korean sport shooter
 Yeo Min-jeong (voice actress), South Korean voice actress
 Yeo Myung-yong (born 1987), South Korean football goalkeeper
 Yeo Oh-hyun (born 1978), South Korean volleyball player
 Yeo Ok, Korean woman poet of the Gojoseon kingdom (which fell in 108 BC)
 Yeo Reum (born 1989), South Korean football midfielder
 Yeo Sang-yeop (born 1984), South Korean speed skater
 Yeo Seung-won (born 1984), South Korean football forward
 Yeo Sung-hae (born 1987), South Korean football defender
 Yeo U-gil (1567–1632), Joseon Dynasty scholar-official
 Yeo Ui-son, Joseon Dynasty civil minister
 Vittoria Yeo (born 1981), South Korean soprano
 Yeo Woon-hyung (1886–1947), Korean politician
 Yeo Woon-kay (1940–2009), South Korean actress
 Yeo Woon-kon (born 1974), South Korean field hockey player

Other
People with other surnames spelled Yeo, or people for whom the Chinese characters of their names are not available: 

 Alby Yeo (born 1936), Australian rules footballer
 Alfred Yeo (British politician) (1863–1928), British politician and businessman
 Alfred Yeo (Australian politician) (1890–1976), member of the New South Wales Legislative Assembly
 Brian Yeo (born 1944), English former footballer
 Caitlin Yeo, Australian film score composer
 Dylan Yeo (born 1986), Canadian ice hockey player
 Douglas Yeo (born 1955), American symphony trombonist and professor
 Edward Roe Yeo (1742–1782), British politician, Member of Parliament for Coventry
 Elliot Yeo (born 1993), Australian football player for the West Coast Eagles
 Frank Ash Yeo (1832–1888), British industrialist and Liberal politician
 Gerald Francis Yeo (1845–1909), Irish physiologist
 Harriet Yeo, British trade unionist
 Isaah Yeo (born 1994), Australian Rugby League player
 Iva Yeo (born 1939), Canadian politician in Manitoba
 James Yeo (shipbuilder) (1789–1868), Cornish-born shipbuilder, merchant, farmer and political figure in Prince Edward Island
 James Yeo (politician) (1827–1903), merchant, ship builder, ship owner, and Canadian Member of Parliament for Prince Edward Island
 James Lucas Yeo (1782–1818), British naval commander who served in the War of 1812
 John Yeo (1837–1924), Canadian parliamentarian 
 Jonathan Yeo (born 1970), British portraitist
 Joseph Yeo (born 1983), Filipino professional basketball player 
 Justin Yeo, Australian rugby league player
 Kristiaan Yeo, Canadian television journalist
 Leonard Yeo (English politician) (died 1586), Member of Parliament for Totnes
 Lindsay Yeo, New Zealand radio host
 Mike Yeo (born 1974), American ice hockey coach
 Norman Yeo (1886–1950), Australian rules footballer
 Peter Yeo (born 1947), Australian rules footballer
 Peter M. Yeo (born 1963), American diplomat
 Richard Yeo (–1779), British medalist and Chief Engraver at the Royal Mint
 Rick Yeo, Canadian ice hockey coach
 Simon Yeo (born 1973), English former footballer 
 Tim Yeo (born 1945), British politician and Member of Parliament
 Walter Yeo (1890–1960), English World War I sailor and early plastic surgery patient
 William Yeo (1896–1972), Australian ex-service leader, farmer, and soldier

See also
 F. F. E. Yeo-Thomas (1902–1964), British Second World War Special Operations Executive agent
 Yeoh, surname

References

English-language surnames
Chinese-language surnames
Korean-language surnames
Multiple Chinese surnames